Seo Jong-min (born 9 May 2002) is a South Korean professional footballer who plays as an attacking midfielder for German club Dynamo Dresden.

Career
A former youth academy player of Eintracht Frankfurt, Seo signed a three-year deal with Dynamo Dresden in June 2021. He made his professional debut for the club on 3 October 2021 in a 3–0 league defeat against FC St. Pauli.

On 7 February 2022, Seo was loaned to Austrian side Wacker Innsbruck until the end of the season.

Personal life
Seo is the son of former South Korean international footballer Seo Dong-won.

Career statistics

References

External links
 

2002 births
Living people
Association football midfielders
South Korean footballers
Dynamo Dresden players
FC Wacker Innsbruck (2002) players
2. Bundesliga players
South Korean expatriate footballers
South Korean expatriate sportspeople in Germany
Expatriate footballers in Germany
South Korean expatriate sportspeople in Austria
Expatriate footballers in Austria